Michele Rucci  is an Italian born neuroscientist and biomedical engineer who studies visual perception. He is a Professor of Brain and Cognitive Sciences and member of the Center for Visual Science at the University of Rochester.

Biography
Rucci received Laurea (MA) and Ph.D. degrees in biomedical engineering from the University of Florence and the Sant'Anna School of Advanced Studies in Pisa, respectively. He trained as a Postdoctoral Fellow at The Neurosciences Institute in San Diego. He was then Professor of Psychological and Brain Sciences at Boston University.

He is primarily known for his work on active perception in humans and machines, particularly for his research on eye movements and for developing robotic systems controlled by computational models of neural pathways in the brain.

Selected works

Kuang X, Gibson M, Shi BE, Rucci M. (2012) Active vision during coordinated head/eye movements in a humanoid robot. IEEE Transactions on Robotics, 99:1-8.

External links 
The University of Rochester page
The Active Perception Laboratory

References

University of Rochester faculty
Boston University faculty
Living people
American bioengineers
American neuroscientists
Italian emigrants to the United States
Visual perception
Year of birth missing (living people)